Hany Adel (born September 8, 1976) is an Egyptian guitarist, vocalist, and screen actor. He was born September 8, 1976, and is the founding member of the Arabic language band Wust El-Balad. He has also played significant supporting roles in a number of contemporary Egyptian films dealing with controversial social and political issues facing Arab society. These films include Microphone (2010), a film about Egypt's culture wars, Asmaa (2011) about a woman living in Cairo with HIV/AIDS, the 2013 film Fatat El Masnaa ("Factory Girl") about gender and class discrimination in modern Egyptian society and the movie Ishtibak ("Clash") set after the political events of June 2013.

Adel is married to Lebanese actress Diamand Bou Abboud.

References

Egyptian male film actors
Egyptian guitarists
20th-century Egyptian male singers
Singers who perform in Egyptian Arabic
Living people
1976 births
21st-century Egyptian male singers
21st-century guitarists